Jimmy Wakely (February 16, 1914 – September 23, 1982) was an American actor, songwriter, country music vocalist, and one of the last singing cowboys. During the 1930s, 1940s and 1950s, he released records, appeared in several B-Western movies with most of the major studios, appeared on radio and television and even had his own series of comic books. His duet singles with Margaret Whiting from 1949 until 1951, produced a string of top seven hits, including 1949's number one hit on the US country chart and pop music chart, "Slippin' Around". Wakely owned two music publishing companies in later years, and performed at the Grand Ole Opry until shortly before his death.

Biography

Early years
James Clarence Wakeley was born in Howard County, Arkansas, United States, but his family moved to Rosedale, Oklahoma by 1920. As a teenager, he changed his surname to Wakely, dropping the second "e".

Country musician
In 1937 in Oklahoma City, Oklahoma, he formed The Bell Boys, a country Western singing group, named after their Bell Clothing sponsor. The group performed locally, made some recordings, and did frequent radio broadcasts over Oklahoma City's WKY. Johnny Bond, Dick Reinhart, Scotty Harrell and Jack Cheney were members of the Bell Boys and later groups.

During a tour through Oklahoma, the musician and movie star Gene Autry invited Wakely to come to California. Autry felt the group might be a good addition to his new Melody Ranch radio show, which debuted on CBS in January 1940. The Wakely Trio joined the show in mid-1940. He stayed for a couple of years, then left because of movie commitments and a recording contract with Decca Records that ran from 1941–1942 through 1947. Johnny Bond stayed with the show for most of its run (the show left the air in 1956).

Personal life
Wakely married Dora Inez Miser on December 13, 1935. They had four children: Deanna, Carol, Linda and son Johnny. Their marriage lasted until his death in 1982.

Western movie actor
In 1939, Wakely made his screen debut (with the Jimmy Wakely Trio) in a Roy Rogers Western, Saga of Death Valley. In 1941, The Jimmy Wakely Trio appeared in Hopalong Cassidy films Twilight on the Trail and Stick to Your Guns, singing songs such as "Lonesome Guitar", "My Kind of Country", and "Twilight on the Trail". In the 1940s, Wakely groups provided songs and musical support for several B-western movies, including appearances with:
the Range Busters at Monogram Pictures
Don "Red" Barry at Republic Pictures
Johnny Mack Brown and Tex Ritter at Universal Pictures
Charles Starrett at Columbia Pictures
Wakely made only one film with Autry, Heart of the Rio Grande, at Republic in 1942. He was sometimes referred to as a low-budget Autry in films. His response was, "Everybody reminds somebody of someone else until they are somebody. And I had rather be compared to Gene Autry than anyone else. Through the grace of God and Gene Autry, I got a career." He appeared in 28 Westerns at Monogram between 1944 and 1949.

Wakely also appeared in some non-Westerns, including I'm from Arkansas in 1944, a showcase for country and hillbilly performers who bring their comedy, tunes and yodeling to Pitchfork, Arkansas.

Recording career
About 1941–1942, Decca gave Wakely a recording contract that ran until 1947. After leaving films, he continued to record, switching to the Capitol label. Though most of his songs were country Western, some crossed over to the pop charts, including collaborations with singer Margaret Whiting and Karen Chandler, and for the Christmas song "Silver Bells". He had a number one country hit with "One Has My Name (The Other Has My Heart)", a song originally released by Western singer Eddie Dean.

Comic books
Like other Western film stars of the era, Wakely had his own comic book series. DC Comics published 18 issues from Sept/Oct 1949–July/Aug 1952, billing him as "Hollywood's Sensational Cowboy Star!"

Radio and television appearances
In addition to Autry's Melody Ranch, Wakely had his own CBS Radio show and co-hosted other programs. He also made several appearances on television variety shows; and in 1961 he was one of five rotating hosts on the NBC-TV program Five Star Jubilee.

He also had one of the last live network radio programs at the NBC radio studios at the corner of Sunset and Vine in Hollywood, California in 1958.  Excerpts of the program appear on Wakely's albums and CDs.

Recording company
In the 1960s and 1970s, Wakely developed Shasta Records and owned two music publishing companies. He converted part of his California ranch into a recording studio, producing recordings for himself as well as for other country Western performers, including Tex Williams, Merle Travis, Eddie Dean, Tex Ritter and Rex Allen. For his recording work, Wakely has a star on the Hollywood Walk of Fame on Vine Street.

Later years
Later in life, Wakely performed at the Grand Ole Opry and National Barn Dance. His nightclub act visited Las Vegas, Reno and other venues. He did a Christmas USO Tour with Bob Hope. He made a few recordings on the Coral, Decca/Vocalion and Dot labels. He made appearances at Western film nostalgia conventions and continued personal appearances and stage shows, often with his daughter Linda and son Johnny in the act.

Death
After contracting emphysema, Wakely died of heart failure at Mission Hills, California on September 23, 1982. He and his wife, who died in 1997, are interred next to each other in the Court of Remembrance at Forest Lawn Memorial Park (Hollywood Hills), Los Angeles, California.

Awards and honors
Wakely was inducted into the Nashville Songwriters Hall of Fame in 1971, and the Western Music Association Hall of Fame in 1991.

Discography

Albums

Selected singles

Collaborations

Filmography

Movies
This is a partial list of his movie credits, most of them are Westerns:

Money, Women and Guns (1959)
Arrow in the Dust (1954)
The Marshal's Daughter (1953)
Lawless Code (1949)
Roaring Westward (1949)
Brand of Fear (1949)
Across the Rio Grande (1949)
Gun Law Justice (1949)
Gun Runner (1949)
Courtin' Trouble (1948)
Outlaw Brand (1948)
Silver Trails (1948)
Cowboy Cavalier (1948)
Range Renegades (1948)
Partners of the Sunset (1948)
The Rangers Ride (1948)
Oklahoma Blues (1948)
Song of the Drifter (1948)
Ridin' Down the Trail (1947)
Song of the Wasteland (1947)
Six-Gun Serenade (1947)
Rainbow Over the Rockies (1947)
Song of the Sierras (1946)
Trail to Mexico (1946)
West of the Alamo (1946)
Moon Over Montana (1946)
The Lonesome Trail (1945)
Riders of the Dawn (1945)
Saddle Serenade (1945)
Springtime in Texas (1945)
Montana Plains (1945)
Rough Ridin' Justice  (1945)
Sagebrush Heroes (1945)
Of the Range (1944)
Git Along Little Pony (1944)
Saddle Leather Law (1944)
Song of the Range (1944)
Cyclone Prairie Rangers (1944)
I'm from Arkansas (1944)
Cowboy from Lonesome River (1944)
Swing in the Saddle (1944)
Sundown Valley (1944)
Cowboy Canteen (1944)
Cowboy in the Clouds (1943)
The Lone Star Trail (1943)
Robin Hood of the Range (1943)
Raiders of San Joaquin (1943)
Cheyenne Roundup (1943)
Tenting Tonight on the Old Camp Ground (1943)
The Old Chisholm Trail (1942)
Strictly in the Groove (1942)
Little Joe, the Wrangler (1942)
Deep in the Heart of Texas (1942)
Come on Danger (1942)
Heart of the Rio Grande (1942)
Twilight on the Trail (1941)
Stick to Your Guns (1941)
Redskins and Redheads (1941)
Bury Me Not on the Lone Prairie (1941)
Six Lessons from Madame La Zonga (1941)
Pony Post (1940)
Texas Terrors (1940)
Give Us Wings (1940)
The Tulsa Kid (1940)
Saga of Death Valley (1939)
Ridin' Down the Trail (1939)

Radio
The Jimmy Wakely Show (1952–1958)
Melody Ranch (1940–1942)
CBS Hollywood Barn Dance (1945–1947)

Television
Wakely appeared as himself on several TV shows including:
The Colgate Comedy Hour (1950)
Toast of the Town (1951)
Ozark Jubilee (ABC, 1956–58, 60)
Country Hoedown (late 1950s, syndicated) sponsored by US Navy Recruiting
Five Star Jubilee (NBC, 1961)
Here's Hollywood (1961)

References

Bibliography
Seemann, Charlie (1998). "Jimmy Wakely". In The Encyclopedia of Country Music. Paul Kingsbury, Editor. New York: Oxford University Press. p. 566.

External links

1914 births
1982 deaths
American country guitarists
American male guitarists
American country singer-songwriters
American male singer-songwriters
American male film actors
Singing cowboys
Male Western (genre) film actors
Singer-songwriters from Oklahoma
Capitol Records artists
Decca Records artists
Dot Records artists
Shasta Records artists
Sterling Records (US) artists
Deaths from emphysema
Burials at Forest Lawn Memorial Park (Hollywood Hills)
20th-century American male actors
20th-century American singers
People from Howard County, Arkansas
20th-century American guitarists
Singer-songwriters from Arkansas
Guitarists from Arkansas
Guitarists from Oklahoma
Country musicians from Oklahoma
Country musicians from Arkansas
20th-century American male singers